Cian Healy (born 7 October 1987) is an Irish rugby union player. He plays for Leinster and has also won over 100 caps for the Ireland national team. He was named as part of the Lions squad for the 2013 British & Irish Lions tour to Australia but withdrew due to injury after playing only twice.

Healy was educated at Belvedere College, Dublin, and won a Leinster Schools Senior Cup medal in 2005. He is registered with Clontarf who play in the All-Ireland League.

Leinster
Healy made his Leinster debut at 19 years old in the 2006–07 season against Border Reivers, when he came of the bench. He transitioned to first choice at his position for Leinster in the 2008–09 season. When as a 21-year-old, Healy was a key part of the Leinster team that won the 2009 Heineken Cup in a 19–16 win against Leicester Tigers.

As a 23-year-old he also played a key part of the 2011 Heineken Cup Final winning team who beat Northampton Saints 33–22. Following that up with another Heineken Cup win the following season, 2011–12, against provincial rivals Ulster 42–14.

Healy continued to be a key player for Leinster in the following seasons, but struggled with a series of injuries, nearly retiring in the summer of 2015 after a neck injury. However he managed to return to playing for Leinster, and after losing 10 kilos, regained his position as first choice in the 2017–2018 season, where he played a key role in Leinster winning its fourth European Cup against Racing 92, along with winning the Pro14 for the first time against the Scarlets. Healy is a member of an elite group of players to have won the European Cup four times, alongside teammates, Devin Toner, Johnny Sexton and Isa Nacewa.

Ireland A
Healy was called into the Ireland A side that was defeated by England Saxons on 1 February 2008.
On 21 June 2009, he was part of the Ireland 'A' team that won the 2009 Churchill Cup against England Saxons by 49–22 in the final in Colorado.

Ireland
He was called up to the Ireland squad for the 2008 Six Nations Championship, but did not play.

In November 2009, he made his international debut in the test against Australia at Croke Park, and was praised afterwards by coach Declan Kidney for his performance. Healy also played against South Africa. He made his Six Nations Championship debut against Italy in Croke Park. Healy also started in Ireland's games against France, England and Wales.

Healy was named Man of the Match in a bruising encounter on 17 September 2011, when Ireland defeated Australia 15–6 at the 2011 Rugby World Cup in Eden Park.

Healy was cited to appear before a disciplinary hearing in London on 13 February 2013, where he received a three-week suspension for stamping on the ankle of opponent player Dan Cole during Ireland's second round encounter with England in the Six Nations Championship.

Healy was a key member of the Grand Slam winning Ireland team during the 2017–2018 Six Nations. Starting four of the five games including the decider against England in Twickenham. Healy scored a try against France in the final game of the 2020 Six Nations as he reached 100 caps for Ireland.

Statistics

International analysis by opposition

Updated as of 18 March 2023.

Honours

Leinster
Heineken Cup (4): 2008–09, 2010–11, 2011–12 2017–18
Pro14 (7): 2007–08, 2012–13, 2013–14, 2017–18, 2018–19, 2019–20, 2020–21
European Challenge Cup (1): 2012–13

Ireland A
Churchill Cup (1): 2009

Ireland
Six Nations Championship (4): 2014, 2015, 2018, 2023
Grand Slam (2): 2018, 2023
Triple Crown (3): 2018, 2022, 2023
Lions 
Lions tours (1): 2013

Other pursuits
Healy has painted portraits of fellow rugby players.

He is also a DJ, calling himself DJ Church, performing at both Oxegen 2010 and Oxegen 2011 in the Electric Ballroom with his band partner DJ Gordo.

References

External links

Leinster profile
Ireland profile
Pro14 profile

1987 births
Living people
Clontarf FC players
Ireland international rugby union players
Irish rugby union players
Leinster Rugby players
People educated at Belvedere College
Rugby union props
British & Irish Lions rugby union players from Ireland
Ireland Wolfhounds international rugby union players
People from Clontarf, Dublin